This is a list of the number-one hits of 1967 on Italian Hit Parade Singles Chart.

See also
1967 in music
List of number-one hits in Italy

References

1967 in Italian music
1967 record charts
1967